The GE E25B is a class of four-axle  B-B electric locomotives made by General Electric (GE) in 1976–77. Only seven units were built, all for use by Texas Utilities on two short industrial freight lines.

Design
Similar to the more powerful E60, the E25B was designed for use hauling coal between mines and power plants on industrial short lines. It was lighter and less powerful than the E60:  on four axles versus  on six, and at  around two-thirds its weight.

Operation
The seven E25B locomotives built were all used by Texas Utilities on the Martin Lake Line (serving the Martin Lake Power Plant) and the Monticello Line (serving the Monticello Steam Electric Station). They were numbered 2304-2306 and 3301-3304. Electrification was activated on the Monticello Line on October 7, 1976, with service beginning the next day.

The Martin Lake Line began operation in 1977, with two its locomotives delivered later. The four locomotives at Martin Lake ran in shuttle service between a mine and the power plant; those at Monticello ran a shuttle service to a mine in Winfield and also interchanged with the mainline at Leesburg. Trains ran in push-pull configuration, with a small caboose cab mounted on a flatcar at the opposite end of the train from the locomotive.

The E25B locomotives were replaced in 1999 by ex-Ferrocarriles Nacionales de México E60 locomotives.

References

External links
TXU Martin Lake Line, TXU Monticello Line

E25B
B-B locomotives
25 kV AC locomotives
Electric locomotives of the United States
Standard gauge locomotives of the United States
Railway locomotives introduced in 1976
Freight locomotives